Nupserha convergens is a species of beetle in the family Cerambycidae. It was described by Per Olof Christopher Aurivillius in 1914.

Varietas
 Nupserha convergens var. pseudogracilis Breuning, 1955
 Nupserha convergens var. gezei Villiers, 1941
 Nupserha convergens var. invitticollis Breuning, 1949
 Nupserha convergens var. fuscoapicata Breuning, 1950
 Nupserha convergens var. subapicata Breuning, 1958
 Nupserha convergens var. flavinotum Aurivillius, 1914

References

convergens
Beetles described in 1914